Datuk Seri Panglima Hajah Azizah binti Mohd Dun (Jawi: عزيزة بنت محمد دون; born 27 March 1955) is a Malaysian politician who served as Chairperson of the Majlis Amanah Rakyat (MARA) from May 2020 to March 2023 and of the Special Select Committee on Fundamental Liberty and Constitutional Rights from November 2021 to November 2022, the Deputy Minister of Women, Family and Community Development and Deputy Minister of Housing and Local Government in the Barisan Nasional (BN) administration under former Prime Ministers Najib Razak and Abdullah Ahmad Badawi as well as former Ministers Rohani Abdul Karim and Ong Ka Ting from May 2013 to May 2018 and from March 2004 to March 2008 respectively. She also served as the State Minister of Community Development and Consumer Affairs of Sabah in the BN state administration under former Chief Minister Musa Aman from 2008 to 2013. In addition, she served as the Member of Parliament (MP) for Beaufort from March 2004 to March 2008 and again from May 2013 to November 2022 as well as Member of the Sabah State Legislative Assembly (MLA) for Klias from March 2008 to May 2013. She is a member of the Malaysian United Indigenous Party (BERSATU), a component party of the Perikatan Nasional (PN) and Gabungan Rakyat Sabah (GRS) as well as formerly Pakatan Harapan (PH) opposition coalitions and was a member of the United Malays National Organisation (UMNO), a component party of the BN coalition. She left UMNO to be an independent in 2018 and later joined BERSATU in 2019.

Personal life 
Azizah was born in the town of Beaufort on 27 March 1955. She is married to Paiman Karim. In 2012, she was involved in a car accident but survived with slight injuries while her bodyguard and driver were seriously injured.

Political career

Fight against child and women abuse 
Azizah strongly opposed child and women abuse. During her candidacy, she organised seminar, talks and action plans to combat domestic crimes involving children and women. She frequently alerted the Malaysian society on the rise of child abuses cases and strongly urged the crimes must be stopped. She also added that children and women should not be subjected to domestic or any kind of violence. Azizah is one of the leader who initiated the state committee to co-ordinate women's activity in line with the country 1Malaysia program.

Support for the disabled 
Azizah is also the supporter for disabled people to be given more aid, moreover following her tragic car accident in 2012 that left her own bodyguard amputated. In 2010, she applaud Kota Kinabalu City Hall Mayor Iliyas Ibrahim for providing more facility to people who have special needs. According to her, the movement made by the Mayor "have been a good contribution to the state".

Elections

2013 general election 
In the 2013 election, Azizah faced Lajim Ukin, a former United Malays National Organisation (UMNO) strongman who had leaped to People's Justice Party (PKR). Azizah was the seat holder for Klias. She changed her seat candidacy to be able to face off her former colleague in the Beaufort parliamentary seat.

2018 general election 
Before the 2018 election, Azizah said she support whoever is the selected candidate for their party even if she is not selected. Prior to the election, she was selected again to representing the Beaufort parliamentary seat and won.

Election results

Honours
  :
  Knight Companion of the Order of the Crown of Pahang (DIMP) – Dato' (2003)
  :
 Commander of the Order of Kinabalu (PGDK) – Datuk (2009)
  Grand Commander of the Order of Kinabalu (SPDK) – Datuk Seri Panglima (2021)

References

External links 
 

1955 births
Living people
People from Sabah
Malaysian Muslims
Malaysian United Indigenous Party politicians
Former United Malays National Organisation politicians
Independent politicians in Malaysia
Members of the Dewan Rakyat
Members of the Dewan Negara
Members of the Sabah State Legislative Assembly
Sabah state ministers
Women members of the Dewan Rakyat
Women members of the Dewan Negara
Women MLAs in Sabah
21st-century Malaysian politicians
Grand Commanders of the Order of Kinabalu
Commanders of the Order of Kinabalu
21st-century Malaysian women politicians